The 1986 Newcastle-under-Lyme by-election was a parliamentary by-election held on 17 July 1986 for the British House of Commons constituency of Newcastle-under-Lyme.

Previous MP 
The seat had become vacant on 24 June 1986. The constituency's Labour Member of Parliament (MP), John Golding (9 March 1931 – 20 January 1999) resigned his seat to become a trade union leader. He did this by being appointed Steward of the Chiltern Hundreds, a notional office of profit under the Crown, which is used to permit MPs to vacate their seats.

John Golding had been an MP since the 1969 by-election in the seat. He was appointed as General Secretary of the National Communications Union in 1986 and retained that office until 1988.

Candidates 
Seven candidates were nominated. The list below is set out in descending order of the number of votes received at the by-election.

1. Representing the Labour Party was the former MPs wife, Llinos Golding (born 21 March 1933). She had worked as a radiographer for twelve years. She then became a member of the North Staffordshire Health Authority. Her father was the late Ness Edwards, who had been a Labour MP and Minister.

Mrs Golding was the Member of Parliament (MP) for Newcastle-under-Lyme from 1986 to 2001. After stepping down at the 2001 general election she was created a Life peer as Baroness Golding, of Newcastle-under-Lyme in the County of Staffordshire in the same year.

2. The Liberal Party candidate, representing the SDP-Liberal Alliance, was Alan Lindley Thomas. He was the Alliance group leader on both Newcastle-under-Lyme Borough Council and Staffordshire County Council. He was a lecturer in computing and was aged 46 at the time of the by-election. He had contested the seat of Stoke-on-Trent Central in the October 1974 and 1979 general elections, as well as the Newcastle-under-Lyme constituency in the 1983 general election.

3. The Conservative candidate was James Charles Barton Nock, a senior partner in a hotel development in Kent. Nock was aged 51 in 1986. He had been a member of Canterbury City Council since 1978 and was Leader of the Council at the time of the by-election.

5. David Edward Sutch (more commonly known as Screaming Lord Sutch) (10 November 1940 – 16 June 1999), was a pop singer and frequent participant in elections. He represented the Official Monster Raving Loony Party at this by-election. This was the twelfth parliamentary election Sutch had been a candidate at.

5. John Alan Gaskell was an Independent, using the ballot paper label "Rainbow Alliance Prince Charles Appreciation Party".

6. James Parker was an Independent candidate, using the ballot paper description "Referendum on Nuclear Energy".

7. David D'Arcy Brewester was another Independent candidate, using the ballot paper label "Rainbow Alliance Bob Geldof Appreciation Party".

Votes

See also
 Newcastle-under-Lyme constituency
 List of United Kingdom by-elections
 United Kingdom by-election records

Sources

 Britain Votes/Europe Votes By-Election Supplement 1983-, compiled and edited by F.W.S. Craig (Parliamentary Research Services 1985)

Newcastle-under-Lyme by-election
Newcastle-under-Lyme by-election
Newcastle-under-Lyme by-election
By-elections to the Parliament of the United Kingdom in Staffordshire constituencies
Politics of the Borough of Newcastle-under-Lyme
20th century in Staffordshire